Naked Truth is the sixth album by German pop singer Jeanette. It was released by Universal Records on 7 April 2006 in German-speaking Europe. A limited deluxe edition of the album was also released on 7 April 2006 with a bonus DVD.

Track listing

Charts

References

External links 
 Official website

2006 albums
Jeanette Biedermann albums